Andanappa Jnanappa Doddameti was an Indian statesman. He was born in Jakkali village, Ron taluk, Kingdom of Mysore (now the state of Karnataka) on 16 March 1908. Andanappa Doddameti was known for his role in the Unification of Karnataka and his significant participation in the Indian Independence Movement.

He was the son of Jnanappa. Andanappa was an agriculturist through ancestry. He joined the Indian National Congress in 1930. In 1933 he was named director of the Karnatak Provincial Congress Committee. He took part in the Non-Cooperation Movement of 1933. He was jailed for half a year and fined 2,000 Indian rupees him for his role in the Ankola stir. Andanappa founded the Dharwad District Harijan Sevak Sangh after his release from jail. He met Mahatma Gandhi in the Yarvada jail, and sought Gandhi's blessing for the work for upliftment of Harijans. Moreover Andanappa served as the president of the Jamkhandi State People's Conference from 1932 to 1948.

He was elected to the Bombay Legislative Assembly from the Dharwad North constituency in 1937. In 1938 he supported a motion for the creation of a Karnatak province, addressing the legislature in Kannada language. He was the first legislator to speak in Kannada in the assembly. He was jailed during a 1940 satyagrah. He was imprisoned during the Quit India movement of 1942, and spent thirty-three months in jail.

He was re-elected to the Bombay Legislative Assembly in 1946. On 1 April 1947 he moved a resolution in the Legislative Assembly calling for the creation of a Karnatak province, which was adopted by the legislature with 60 votes in favour and 8 against. He was re-elected to the Bombay Legislative Assembly in the 1952 elections, representing the Ron constituency. He served as the Working President of the Karnatak Unification League. Andanappa was a Member of the Bombay Legislative Assembly until 1956. From 1956 onwards he was a Member of the Mysore Legislative Assembly. He was re-elected to the Mysore Legislative Assembly in 1957, 1962 and 1967. In 1957 and 1966 he moved a resolutions in the Mysore Legislative Assembly, calling for the state to be re-named 'Karnataka'.

In 1968 he was named as Minister of State for Minor Irrigation in the Mysore state government. His tenure as Minister ended in March 1971.

He died on 21 February 1972.

References

1908 births
1972 deaths
Indian National Congress politicians from Karnataka
Bombay State MLAs 1952–1957
Mysore MLAs 1952–1957
Mysore MLAs 1957–1962
Mysore MLAs 1962–1967
Mysore MLAs 1967–1972
Members of the Mysore Legislature

kn:ಅಂದಾನಪ್ಪ ದೊಡ್ಡಮೇಟಿ